Inka Unverzagt (married name Ingeborg Schmitz-Unverzagt (18 April 1924 – 1 October 2016) was a German ballerina, ballet master, choreographer and dance teacher. She worked at the Hans Otto Theater in Potsdam and for DEFA.

Life 
Unverzagt was born in 1924 as the daughter of a comedian and a costume seamstress in Chemnitz. At the request of her father, she received her first ballet lessons at the age of six. She was also taught piano and accordion. After nine years of ballet studies, she graduated from the Leipzig Opera in 1939.

At the age of 15 she was engaged at the Staatstheater Augsburg. Since that time, she used her pseudonym Inka Unverzagt.

There, in 1947, Fritz Reuter's adaptation of her ballet Henrikje premiered. From 1952 to 1954, she worked at the Rostock People's Theatre, where her most important role was Juliet in Prokofiev's Romeo and Juliet. In 1954, she moved to the Hans Otto Theatre in Potsdam. There she was involved in performances of, among others, Cinderella, Coppélia and Scheherazade. Although the artistic directors Ilse Rodenberg and Gerhard Meyer were very open to ballet, the company was disbanded in the mid-1960s. She then worked as a freelance choreographer and dancer at DEFA, where she took part in 60 productions. Among others, she worked with the actor Gojko Mitić. In the 1970s she was again engaged for musical theatre productions at the Hans Otto Theatre.

After a fall, she had to end her teaching activities in the 2000s.

Unverzagt was married to the actor Willy Schmitz († 1987). She lived in Potsdam from 1954. She died in 2016 at the age of 92 in the Evangelische Seniorenzentrum Hasenheyer-Stift in Potsdam.

Filmography 
 1954/55: Swelling Melodies (performer)
 1958:  (performer)
 1964: Die goldene Gans (choreographer)
 1967/68: Spur des Falken (choreographer)
 1972/73: Das unsichtbare Visier – 1st sequel: Der römische Weg (performer)
 1972/73: Das unsichtbare Visier – 2nd sequel: Das Nest im Urwald (performer)
 1972/73: Das unsichtbare Visier – 3rd sequel: Das Wasserschloß (performer)
 1973/74:  (choreographer)
 1974:  (choreographer)
 1975: Till Eulenspiegel (choreographer)
 1976: In the Dust of the Stars (choreographer)
 1979/80: The Fiancee (performer)

Publications 
 Unverzagtes aus Potsdam und von anderswo. Gedichte. I. Unverzagt, Potsdam 2012.

Further reading 
 Herbert A. Frenzel, Hans Joachim Moser (ed.): Kürschners biographisches Theater-Handbuch. Schauspiel, Oper, Film, Rundfunk. Deutschland, Österreich, Schweiz. de Gruyter, Berlin 1956.

Birthday wishes and obituaries
 Klaus Büstrin: Der Tanz war ihr Leben. In: Potsdamer Neueste Nachrichten, Nr. 236, 8 October 2016, .
 Birgit Gorholt: Ein Leben für den Tanz. In Märkische Allgemeine, 8 October 2016, .
 Karin Markert: Die mit dem Sohn der Großen Bärin tanzt. In Märkische Allgemeine, 17 April 2014, .
 Chantal Willers: Ein Leben für den Tanz. In Potsdamer Neuste Nachrichten, Nr. 94, 23 April 2014, .

References

External links 
 
 Inka Unverzagt on Filmportal.
 
 Inka Unverzagt on British Film Institute

Dance teachers
Ballet choreographers
German ballerinas
Pseudonyms
1924 births
2016 deaths
People from Chemnitz